Stenarctia quadripunctata is a moth in the subfamily Arctiinae. It is found in Angola, Cameroon, the Democratic Republic of Congo, Gabon, Kenya and Uganda.

References

Natural History Museum Lepidoptera generic names catalog

Arctiini